Cape Coloureds are a South African ethnic classification consisted primarily of persons of mixed race African, Asian & European descent. Although Coloureds form a minority group within South Africa, they are the predominant population group in the Western Cape.

They are generally bilingual, speaking Afrikaans and English, though some speak only one of these. Cape Coloureds were classified under apartheid as a subset of the larger Coloured race group.

At least one genetic study indicates that Cape Coloureds have an ancestry consisting of the following cultural frames:
 Khoisan-speaking Africans: (32–43%)
 Bantu-speaking Africans: (20–36%)
 Ethnic groups in Europe: (21–28%)
 Asian peoples: (9–11%)

The most used racial slurs against Cape Coloureds are Hottentot or hotnot and Kaffir. The term "hotnot" is a derogatory term used to refer to Khoisan people and coloureds in South Africa. The term originated from the Dutch language, where "Hottentot" was used to describe a language spoken by the Khoisan people. It later came to be used as a derogatory term for the people themselves, based on European perceptions of their physical appearance and culture. The term is often used to demean and dehumanize Khoisan and coloured people, perpetuating harmful stereotypes and discrimination against them. The term "kaffir" is a racial slur used to refer to coloured people and black people in South Africa. It originated from Arabic and was used to refer to non-Muslims. Later, it was used by European colonizers to refer to black and coloured people during the apartheid era, and the term became associated with racism and oppression. While it is still used against Coloured people, it is not as prevalent as it is against black people.

Origin and history

The Cape Coloureds are a heterogeneous South African ethnic group, with diverse ancestral links. Ancestry may include European settlers, indigenous Khoi and San and Xhosa people, and slaves imported from the Dutch East Indies (or a combination of all). People from India and the islands within the Indian Ocean region were also taken to the Cape and sold into slavery by the Dutch settlers. The Indian slaves were almost invariably given Christian names but their places of origin were indicated in the records of sales and other documents so that it is possible to get an idea of the ratio of slaves from different regions. These slaves were, however, dispersed and lost their Indian cultural identity over the course of time. Slaves of Malay and other ancestry were brought from India, Indonesia, Malaysia, Madagascar, and Mozambique. This diverse assortment of people was subsequently classified as a single group under the Apartheid regime. 

The census in South Africa during 1911 played a significant role in defining racial identities in the country. One of the most noteworthy aspects of this census was the instructions given to enumerators on how to classify individuals into different racial categories. The category of "coloured persons" was used to refer to all people of mixed race, and this category included various ethnic groups such as Hottentots, Bushmen, Cape Malays, Griquas, Korannas, Creoles, Negroes, and Cape Coloureds.

Of particular importance is the fact that the instruction to classify "coloured persons" as a distinct racial group included individuals of African descent, commonly referred to as Negroes. Therefore, it is important to note that Coloureds or Cape Coloureds, as a group of mixed-race individuals, also have African ancestry and can be considered as part of the broader African diaspora.

Under Apartheid, under the Population Registration Act as amended, the term Cape Coloured referred to a subset of Coloured South Africans, with subjective criteria having been used by the bureaucracy to determine whether a person was a Cape Coloured, or belonged to one of a number of other related subgroups such as the "Cape Malays", or "Other Coloureds".

Cape Coloureds in the media

A group of Cape Coloureds were interviewed in the documentary series Ross Kemp on Gangs. One of the gang members who participated in the interview mentioned that black South Africans have been the main beneficiaries of South African social promotion initiatives while the Cape Coloureds have been further marginalised.

The 2009 film I'm Not Black, I'm Coloured - Identity Crisis at the Cape of Good Hope (Monde World Films, US release) is one of the first historical documentary films to explore the legacy of Apartheid through the viewpoint of the Cape Coloured community, including interviews with elders, pastors, members of Parliament, students and everyday people struggling to find their identity in the new South Africa. The film's 2016 sequel Word of Honour: Reclaiming Mandela’s Promise (Monde World Films, US release) 

Various books have covered the subject matter of Coloured identity and heritage.

Patric Tariq Mellet, heritage activist and author of 'The Camissa Embrace' and co-creator of The Camissa Museum, has composed a vast online blog archive ('Camissa People') of heritage information concerning Coloured ancestry tracing to the Indigenous San and Khoe and Malagasy, East African, Indonesian, Indian, Bengal and Sri Lankan slaves.

Terminology

The term "coloured" is currently treated as a neutral description in Southern Africa, classifying people of mixed race ancestry. "Coloured" may be seen as offensive in some other western countries, such as Britain and the United States of America. Cape Coloureds identify as black in every other country besides Namibia. They are black, e.g. in the United States of America and Britain. The reason why Cape Coloureds identify as black in every other country besides Namibia is because the racial classification in other countries are different from South Africa and Namibia's racial classification and other countries don't have the racial classification "coloured".

Notable people

Politicians
 
 
 Midi Achmat, South African writer and LGBT rights activist
 Zackie Achmat, South African HIV/AIDS activist and filmmaker
 Neville Alexander, Political activist, educationalist and lecturer.
 Allan Boesak (Political activist & Cleric).
 Patricia de Lille, former PAC, then Independent Democrats leader, then Democratic Alliance mayor of Cape Town, now leader of Good Party
 Tony Ehrenreich, South African trades unionist.
 Zainunnisa Gool, South African Political activist and representative on the Cape Town City Council.
 Alex La Guma, South African novelist and leader of the South African Coloured People's Organisation.
 Trevor Manuel, former Finance Minister, currently Head of the National Planning Commission of South Africa.
 Peter Marais, former Unicity Mayor of Cape Town and Former Premier of the Western Cape
 Gerald Morkel, former mayor of Cape Town
 Dan Plato, Western Cape Community Safety Minister.
 Dulcie September, political activist.
 Adam Small, political activist, poet and writer.
 Percy Sonn, former president of the International Cricket Council.
 Simon van der Stel, last commander and first Governor of the Dutch Cape Colony.

Artists and writers
 
 

 Peter Abrahams, writer
 Tyrone Appollis, academic
 Willie Bester
 Dennis Brutus, journalist, poet, activist
 Peter Clarke
 Phillippa Yaa de Villiers, writer and performance artist
 Garth Erasmus, artist
 Diana Ferrus, poet, writer and performance artist
 Oliver Hermanus, writer, director
 Rozena Maart, writer
 Mustafa Maluka
 Dr. Don Mattera
 James Matthews, writer
 Selwyn Milborrow, poet, writer, journalist
 Sizwe Mpofu-Walsh
 Arthur Nortje, poet
 Robin Rhode
 Richard Moore Rive, writer
 Tracey Rose
 Adam Small, writer
 Zoë Wicomb, writer
 Athol Williams, poet, writer, scholar, social philosopher

Actors and actresses
 
 

 Quanita Adams, actress
 Natalie Becker, actress
 Lesley-Ann Brandt, actress 
 Meryl Cassie, actress from the television series The Tribe.
 Vincent Ebrahim, actor
 Vinette Ebrahim, actress
 Kim Engelbrecht, actress, Dominion, Isidingo, The Flash, Boy Called Twist
 Jarrid Geduld, actor, Boy Called Twist, A Lucky Man, Ellen: The Ellen Pakkies Story, Indemnity, Aarendsvlei
 Shannon Kook, actor
 Kandyse McClure, actress, Battlestar Galactica (2004 TV series) (resides in Canada)
 Shamilla Miller, actress 
 Blossom Tainton-Lindquist

Beauty queens
 
 

 Tansey Coetzee, Miss South Africa 2007
 Tamaryn Green, Miss South Africa 2018
 Amy Kleinhans, former Miss South Africa 1992 and first non-white Miss South Africa.
 Liesl Laurie, Miss South Africa 2015
 Jo-Ann Strauss, Miss South Africa 2000, media personality and business woman.

Musicians
 
 

 AKA, hip-hop recording artist
 Fallon Bowman, South African-born guitarist, singer, and actor. 
 Jonathan Butler, jazz musician.
 Paxton Fielies, singer
 Jean Grae, hip-hop artist.
 Paul Hanmer, pianist and composer
 Abdullah Ibrahim, jazz pianist
 Robbie Jansen, musician
 Trevor Jones, South African-born film composer.
 Taliep Petersen, musician and director
 YoungstaCPT, rapper

Others
 
 
 Marc Lottering, comedian
 Jenny Powell, television presenter.
 Trevor Noah

Athletics

 Shaun Abrahams, 800m runner
 Cornel Fredericks, track-and-field sprinter
 Paul Gorries, Sprinter
 Leigh Julius, 2004-08 Olympian
 Geraldine Pillay, 2004 Olympian, Commonwealth medallist
 Wayde van Niekerk, track-and-field sprinter, Olympic and World Champion, and World Record Holder

Cricket

 Paul Adams
 Vincent Barnes
 Loots Bosman
 Henry Davids
 Basil D'Oliveira
 Damian D'Oliveira
 JP Duminy
 Herschelle Gibbs
 Beuran Hendricks
 Reeza Hendricks
 Omar Henry
 Garnett Kruger
 Charl Langeveldt
 Wayne Parnell
 Alviro Petersen
 Robin Peterson
 Keegan Petersen
 Vernon Philander
 Dane Piedt
 Ashwell Prince
 Roger Telemachus

Field hockey

 Clyde Abrahams
 Liesel Dorothy
 Ignatius Malgraff

Football
 
 

 Kurt Abrahams
 Cole Alexander
 Oswin Appollis
 Andre Arendse
 Tyren Arendse
 Wayne Arendse
 Bradley August
 Brendan Augustine 
 Emile Baron
 Shaun Bartlett
 Tyrique Bartlett
 David Booysen
 Mario Booysen
 Ethan Brooks
 Delron Buckley
 Brent Carelse
 Daylon Claasen
 Rivaldo Coetzee
 Keanu Cupido
 Clayton Daniels
 Lance Davids
 Rushine De Reuck
 Keagan Dolly
 Kermit Erasmus
 Jody February
 Taariq Fielies
 Quinton Fortune
 Bevan Fransman
 Stanton Fredericks
 Reeve Frosler
 Ruzaigh Gamildien
 Morgan Gould
 Victor Gomes, referee
 Travis Graham
 Ashraf Hendricks
 Rowan Human
 Rudi Isaacs
 Willem Jackson
 Moeneeb Josephs
 David Kannemeyer
 Ricardo Katza
 Daine Klate
 Lyle Lakay
 Lee Langeveldt
 Clinton Larsen
 Luke Le Roux
 Stanton Lewis
 Benni McCarthy, South Africa national team's all-time top scorer with 31 goals
 Fabian McCarthy
 Leroy Maluka
 Grant Margeman
 Wiseman Meyiwa
 Bryce Moon
 Nasief Morris
 Tashreeq Morris
 James Musa
 Andile Ncobo, referee
 Morne Nel
 Andras Nemeth
 Reagan Noble
 Brad Norman
 Riyaad Norodien
 Bernard Parker
 Peter Petersen
 Brandon Peterson
 Steven Pienaar
 Reyaad Pieterse
 Wayne Roberts
 Frank Schoeman
 Ebrahim Seedat
 Brandon Silent
 Elrio van Heerden
 Dino Visser
 Shu-Aib Walters
 Mark Williams, scored both goals to win the 1996 African Cup of Nations final
 Ronwen Williams

Rugby

 Gio Aplon
 Nizaam Carr
 Kurt Coleman, Western Province and Stormers player
 Bolla Conradie
 Juan de Jongh
 Peter de Villiers
 Justin Geduld, Sprinbok 7’s
 Bryan Habana
 Cornal Hendricks
 Adrian Jacobs
 Conrad Jantjes
 Elton Jantjies
 Herschel Jantjies 
 Ricky Januarie
 Ashley Johnson
 Cheslin Kolbe, Western Province and Stormers player
 Dillyn Leyds, Western Province and Stormers player
 Lionel Mapoe
 Breyton Paulse
 Earl Rose
 Tian Schoeman 
 Errol Tobias
 Jaco van Tonder
 Ashwin Willemse
 Chester Williams

Others 
 

 Christopher Gabriel, basketball player
 Raven Klaasen - tennis player
 Devon Petersen - darts player
 Kenny Solomon, South Africa's first chess grandmaster

See also
Cape Corps
District Six
Kaapse Klopse

References

 
Afrikaner diaspora
Ethnic groups in South Africa
History of the Dutch East India Company